In neurobiology, the length constant (λ) is a mathematical constant used to quantify the distance that a graded electric potential will travel along a neurite via passive electrical conduction. The greater the value of the length constant, the farther the potential will travel. A large length constant can contribute to spatial summation—the electrical addition of one potential with potentials from adjacent areas of the cell.

The length constant can be defined as:

 

where rm is the membrane resistance (the force that impedes the flow of electric current from the outside of the membrane to the inside, and vice versa), ri is the axial resistance (the force that impedes current flow through the axoplasm, parallel to the membrane), and ro is the extracellular resistance (the force that impedes current flow through the extracellular fluid, parallel to the membrane). In calculation, the effects of ro are negligible, so the equation is typically expressed as:

 

The membrane resistance is a function of the number of open ion channels, and the axial resistance is generally a function of the diameter of the axon. The greater the number of open channels, the lower the rm. The greater the diameter of the axon, the lower the ri.

The length constant is used to describe the rise of potential difference across the membrane

 

The fall of voltage can be expressed as:

 

Where voltage, V, is measured in millivolts, x is distance from the start of the potential (in millimeters), and λ is the length constant (in millimeters).

Vmax is defined as the maximum voltage attained in the action potential, where:

 

where rm is the resistance across the membrane and I is the current flow.

Setting for x = λ for the rise of voltage sets V(x) equal to .63 Vmax. This means that the length constant is the distance at which 63% of Vmax has been reached during the rise of voltage.

Setting for x = λ for the fall of voltage sets V(x) equal to .37 Vmax, meaning that the length constant is the distance at which 37% of Vmax has been reached during the fall of voltage.

By resistivity 
Expressed with resistivity rather than resistance, the constant λ is (with negligible ro):

Where  is the radius of the neuron.

The radius and number 2 come from these equations:

Expressed in this way, it can be seen that the length constant increases with increasing radius of the neuron.

See also 
 Isopotential muscle
 Time constant

References 

Electrophysiology